IBM Systems Director is an element management system (EMS) (sometimes referred to as a "workgroup management system") first introduced by IBM in 1993 as NetFinity Manager. The software was originally written to run on OS/2 2.0. It has subsequently gone through a number of name changes in the interim. It was changed in 1996 to IBM PC SystemView. Later that same year, it was renamed to TME 10 NetFinity. The following year, it reverted to a slightly altered version of its original name: IBM Netfinity Manager (note the lowercase 'f').

In 1999, IBM announced Netfinity Director; a new product based on Tivoli IT Director. It was intended as a replacement for IBM Netfinity Manager. When IBM renamed its Netfinity line of enterprise servers to xSeries, the name was changed to IBM Director.

With the release of version 6.1, the product was renamed from IBM Director to IBM Systems Director.

IBM Director consists of 3 components: an agent, a console and a server. To take full advantage of IBM Director's capabilities, the IBM Director Agent must be installed on the monitored system. Inventory and management data are stored in an SQL database (Oracle, SQL Server, IBM DB2 Universal Database or PostgreSQL) which can be separate or on the same server where IBM Director Server resides. Smaller deployments can also utilize Microsoft Jet or MSDE. The server is configured and managed using the IBM Director Console from any Linux or Microsoft Windows workstation.

IBM Systems Director has been removed from marketing and is scheduled to reach end of service in April 2018.

IBM Director is composed of these major tasks 
 Asset ID
 BladeCenter Management
 CIM Browser
 Command Automation
 Configure SNMP Agent
 Data Capture Policy Manager
 Event Action Plans
 Event Log
 External Application Launch
 File Transfer
 Hardware Status
 Inventory
 JMX Browser
 Microsoft Cluster Browser
 Network Configuration
 Process Management
 Rack Manager
 Remote Control
 Remote Session
 Retail Peripheral Management (needs Retail Extensions)
 RMA Software Distribution
 Resource Monitors 
 Scheduler
 Server Configuration Manager
 Service and Support Management
 SNMP Browser
 Software Distribution
 System Accounts
 Update Manager
 User Administration

Major releases 
 IBM Systems Director 6.3 (out of service)
 IBM Systems Director 6.2 (out of service)
 IBM Systems Director 6.1 (out of service)
 IBM Director 5.20.3 (out of service)
 IBM Director 5.20.2 (out of service)
 IBM Director 5.20.1 (out of service)
 IBM Director 5.20.0 (out of service)
 IBM Director 5.10.3 (out of service)
 IBM Director 5.10.2 (out of service)
 IBM Director 5.10.1 (out of service)
 IBM Director 5.10.0 (out of service)
 IBM Director 4.22 (out of service)
 IBM Director 4.21 (out of service)
 IBM Director 4.20 (out of service)
 IBM Director 4.12 (out of service)
 IBM Director 4.11 (out of service)
 IBM Director 4.10 (out of service)
 IBM Director 3.1.1 (out of service)

See also 
 IBM Systems Director Console for AIX
 System Center Operations Manager
 Oracle Enterprise Manager

References
 IBM Official Director Forums

External links 
 IBM Director home page
 IBM Systems Director download page
 An Introduction to Using IBM Systems Director to Manage IBM i 

IBM Systems Director 6.3.x
 IBM Systems Director Release Notes
 IBM Software Information Center

IBM Systems Director 6.2.x
 IBM Systems Director Release Notes
 IBM Software Information Center

Director
Network management